Toribio de Peñalva (c.1606-c.1685) was a Spanish military man, who served during the Viceroyalty of Peru as Alcalde de la hermandad and Procurator General of Buenos Aires.

Biography 
He was born in Piélagos, Santander, Spain, the son of Toribio de Peñalva and Juliana Cevallos. He arrived in Buenos Aires from Rio de Janeiro, in the company of governor Francisco de Céspedes in 1619. He was married in the city with Ana de Sosa, daughter of Vicente Simoes and Francisca de Souza, belonging to a rich Portuguese family established in Buenos Aires.

His main activity in Buenos Aires was commerce, but he also dedicating himself to the militia and politics, serving as Commander of the garrison, mayor, and attorney general of the city.. In 1640, Peñalva received land grants, and purchased the ranch of Amador Báez de Alpoim, a noble neighbor of Buenos Aires. 

Toribio de Peñalva was one of the largest landowners in the Province of Buenos Aires during the early years of the colonial period. His sons and descendants were related to the families of Pedro de Roxas y Acevedo and Juan de Garay y Becerra.

References

External links 
Protocolos, 1584-1756 - Testament of Toribio de Peñalva

1606 births
1685 deaths
People from Buenos Aires
17th-century Spanish nobility
17th-century Spanish military personnel
Spanish colonial governors and administrators
People from Santander, Spain